Wheelock "Lock" Whitney III (born October 3, 1949, in New Haven, Connecticut) is an American art collector and dealer.

Early life and education
Born in Connecticut, Whitney is the son of Wheelock Whitney, Jr. and Irene Hixon. He is the grandson of Wheelock Whitney, Sr. Whitney grew up in the Minnesota branch of the prominent American Whitney family and is of close relation to the Vanderbilt family.

Career
His published books include:
 Gericault in Italy 

He has contributed more than fifty notable 18th- and 19th-century paintings, mainly French, to the Metropolitan Museum of Art in New York.

He is a philanthropist living on the Upper East Side of Manhattan and in the Town of Rhinebeck in Dutchess County, New York.

Personal life
He is the son of Wheelock Whitney, Jr., grandson of Wheelock Whitney, Sr., and the brother of Benson Whitney. His father married Chief Justice Kathleen A. Blatz of the Minnesota Supreme Court in 2005, who was five years his son's junior.

References

1949 births
20th-century American historians
20th-century American male writers
20th-century American philanthropists
20th-century art collectors
21st-century American historians
21st-century American male writers
21st-century American philanthropists
21st-century art collectors
American art collectors
American art historians
American art patrons
American people of English descent
Historians from Connecticut 
Historians from New York (state)
Living people
People from Rhinebeck, New York
People from the Upper East Side
 Philanthropists from Connecticut
Philanthropists from New York (state)
Ralph Wheelock family
Whitney family
Writers from Manhattan
Writers from New Haven, Connecticut 
Writers from Saint Paul, Minnesota